The 2022–23 Dartmouth Big Green Men's ice hockey season was the 116th season of play for the program and the 61st in the ECAC Hockey conference. The Big Green represented the Dartmouth College and were coached by Reid Cashman, in his 2nd season as head coach.

Season
After finishing the previous season at the bottom of the conference standings, Dartmouth was hoping to see some improvement in Reid Cashman's second year. Unfortunately, the team had to first contend with replacing its entire stable of goaltenders. Cooper Black eventually won the job and played well in his freshman season. The Big Green allowed roughly the same amount of goals per game as they had the year before. While those numbers weren't necessarily good, they weren't poor either. The biggest problem for the team was, again, its lack of offense. Over the course of the season, Dartmouth averaged just over 2 goals per game, which was hardly sufficient for a squad that allowed an average of 3.52 goals against per game.

From the first game it was apparent that the Greens didn't have the scoring punch to compete at the same level as most other teams and Dartmouth won just once in its first 13 games. The second half of the season was only marginally better than the first but the offense didn't see any improvement. Dartmouth finished the season with just 5 wins, three coming against Yale, who possessed the worse offense in the ECAC. The Big Green finished dead last in the standing for a second year in a row and were knocked out of the postseason after just one game.

Departures

Recruiting

Roster
As of September 20, 2022.

Standings

Schedule and results

|-
!colspan=12 style=";" | Exhibition

|-
!colspan=12 style=";" | Regular Season

|-
!colspan=12 style=";" | 

|-
!colspan=12 style=";" | 

|-
!colspan=12 style=";" |

Scoring statistics

Goaltending statistics

Rankings

Note: USCHO did not release a poll in weeks 1, 13, or 26.

References

2022-23
Dartmouth Big Green
Dartmouth Big Green
Dartmouth Big Green
Dartmouth Big Green